is an upcoming role-playing video game being developed by Rabbit and Bear Studios, with director Yoshitaka Murayama, creator of Konami’s Suikoden series, at the helm. It is promoted as a spiritual successor of the Suikoden series itself.

Development and release 
The development of Eiyuden Chronicle: Hundred Heroes is led by Yoshitaka Murayama, the creator of the Suikoden video game series which is owned and published by Konami. Murayama had directed Suikoden and Suikoden II during his time at Konami, but left the company in 2002 shortly before the release of Suikoden III. 

The fundraising campaign for the Eiyuden Chronicle project was conducted through the crowdfunding platform Kickstarter. The campaign exceeded all of the original stretch goals and met its base funding requirements after surpassing $500,000 within 3 to 4 hours on July 27, 2020. It ultimately raised $4,541,481 with 46,307 backers, making it the third highest funded video game in Kickstarter history behind Shenmue III and Bloodstained: Ritual of the Night.

Hundred Heroes was featured during Microsoft and Bethesda's showcase at E3 2021 and was originally slated to be released worldwide in October 2022, but it was delayed due to the COVID-19 pandemic. The game is set to be released for Windows, PlayStation 4, PlayStation 5, Xbox One, Xbox Series X/S and Nintendo Switch in 2023. 

A companion game and direct prequel, Eiyuden Chronicle: Rising, was released for Windows, Nintendo Switch, PlayStation 4, PlayStation 5, Xbox One, Xbox Series X/S and Xbox Game Pass on May 10, 2022.

References

External links
 Official website 
 Official website at Xbox 

Upcoming video games scheduled for 2023
505 Games games
Crowdfunded video games
Nintendo Switch games
Role-playing video games
Suikoden
Single-player video games
PlayStation 4 games
PlayStation 5 games
Xbox One games
Xbox Series X and Series S games
Windows games
Video games developed in Japan
Kickstarter-funded video games